Smith! is a 1969 American Western film made by Walt Disney Productions, directed by Michael O'Herlihy, and starring Glenn Ford.

Plot
Native American Jimmyboy flees to a ranch owned by Smith, a white man raised by a Native American. Jimmyboy has been accused of a crime by a white man and fears he will not receive a fair trial. Smith helps Jimmyboy deal with a cruel sheriff and persuades him to surrender to the local authorities, promising him he will act as a defense witness during court proceedings.

Cast
Glenn Ford as Smith
Nancy Olson as Norah Smith
Dean Jagger as Judge Brown
Warren Oates as Walter Charlie 
Chief Dan George as Ol' Antoine 
Frank Ramírez as Gabriel Jimmyboy
John Randolph as Mr. Edwards 
Keenan Wynn as Vince Heber 
Christopher Shea as Alpie
Roger Ewing as Donald Maxwell
Jay Silverheels as McDonald Lasheway 
James Westerfield as Sheriff 
Fred Aldrich as Restaurant Patron (uncredited)
William Bryant as Corporal/Court Bailiff (uncredited)
Melanie Griffith as Extra (uncredited)
Gregg Palmer as Sergeant, Court Bailiff (uncredited)

See also
 List of American films of 1969

References

External links

1960s English-language films
1969 films
Walt Disney Pictures films
1969 Western (genre) films
American Western (genre) films
Films directed by Michael O'Herlihy
1960s American films